Ihor Kryvobok (born 28 July 1978) is a former Ukrainian footballer.

External links

 
 

1978 births
Living people
Ukrainian footballers
Association football forwards
Ukrainian expatriate footballers
Expatriate footballers in Belarus
Expatriate footballers in Armenia
Ukrainian expatriate sportspeople in Armenia
Ukrainian expatriate sportspeople in Belarus
FC Metalurh-2 Zaporizhzhia players
FC Kryvbas Kryvyi Rih players
MFC Mykolaiv players
SC Olkom Melitopol players
FC Spartak Sumy players
FC Krymteplytsia Molodizhne players
FC Spartak Ivano-Frankivsk players
FC Neman Grodno players
FC Granit Mikashevichi players
FC Smorgon players
FC Torpedo-BelAZ Zhodino players
FC Lida players
FC Naftan Novopolotsk players
Footballers from Kharkiv